The 2001–02 Women's National Cricket League season was the sixth season of the Women's National Cricket League, the women's domestic limited overs cricket competition in Australia. The tournament started on 3 November 2001 and finished on 3 February 2002. Defending champions New South Wales Breakers won the tournament for the sixth time after topping the ladder at the conclusion of the group stage and beating Victorian Spirit by two games to zero in the finals series.

Ladder

Fixtures

1st final

2nd final

References

 
Women's National Cricket League seasons
 
Women's National Cricket League